Sanskriti School is a recognised integrated co-educational school in the diplomatic area of Chanakyapuri, New Delhi. It is affiliated to CBSE, and offers education from  Nursery to XII. It was founded in 1998 primarily to provide education to children of All India Services and Allied services officers and Defence Services Personnel on transfer. The school is run by Civil Services Society, an NGO formed by senior civil servants and their wives, with the spouse of the serving Cabinet Secretary of India as its chairperson.

Overview

The first principal of the school was Mrs. Gowri Ishwaran, who headed the institution until 2008. She was followed by Mrs. Abha Sehgal, who was incumbent from the session of 2008-09 onwards. Her last day at the school was on 11 April 2017. The new principal is Mrs. Richa Agnihotri.

The foundation stone for Sanskriti School was laid by Mrs Hemi Surendra Singh, chairperson, Civil Services Society on 30 May 1996. Mrs.  Singh was instrumental in getting the land and building allocated while her husband was Cabinet Secretary of India Surendra Singh. She thus continued in the tradition of her philanthropic father Thakur Dan Singh Bist, Dan Singh Bist founder of DSB college, Nainital. Sanskriti School was established on  12 August 1998 by the Civil Services Society, formed by the wives of the civil servants belonging to the various branches of Government of India. Mrs. Gowri Ishwaran took over as the founder principal in 1999. The aim of the Society is to fulfill a need in the city of Delhi for educating the children of officers of the All India and Allied Services and defence personnel moving to Delhi on transfer. Students whose parents are in other services or professions may also apply. The school has also admitted students from marginalised backgrounds since 2004. At present, the School admits 25% students from economically weaker sections of society.

School is a public-service–oriented, non-profit organization, with Jaya Chandrasekhar, the spouse of K. M. Chandrasekhar, the previous Cabinet Secretary, as its  chairperson. The school was founded by Mrs. Hemi Surendra Singh, the wife of Surendra Singh, a former Cabinet Secretary, Mrs. Livleen Bhagat, wife of a former Director of the Intelligence Bureau and Mrs. Ramachandran among others.

The school has 60% of seats are for the children of Group A officers, of the who enter service through the Civil Services Examination, this includes Group A officers of Indian Foreign Service (IFS), Indian Administrative Service (IAS), Indian Revenue Service (IRS), Indian Police Service (IPS). Besides this 10% for general public, 5% for staff and 25% for children under the Economically Weaker Section (EWS) category.

However the  Delhi High Court started suo motu case against the school receiving state funding and free land, which in turn converted into a Public Interest Litigation (PIL) in 2006. In November 2014, the Delhi High Court bench of Justice Pradeep Nandrajog and Justice Mukta Gupta ruled against the quota system stating, "Reserving seats for a particular branch of the Indian Services disadvantages children of persons engaged in other branches."

Infrastructure

Amphitheater
The Amphitheater is the nerve center of Sanskriti. Built strategically in the very center of the school, all assemblies, special ceremonies, such as prize distributions, investiture ceremony, citation for the graduating batch of Class XII and other such events are held here. As it is built in a semi-circular style, it can seat around 600 people and its circular stage can easily accommodate 50 to 60 children during a performance.

Library
A centrally air-conditioned circular building over three floors houses the junior, middle and senior school libraries . The library is located centrally in the school to facilitate ease of access. The library has a collection of fiction, non – fiction and reference books. The latest collection of subject reference books supplementing the textbooks is available to the students.

Sports 
Aquatic events like inter-school and inter-house swimming competitions are held in the pool, that is built to international standards. The pool is open to the staff, students and the parents of the Sanskriti school during various predesignated time slots.

The paddle pool in the junior wing of the school is for the little ones to splash about during the hot summer months.

Curriculum
The school follows the curriculum prescribed by the CBSE and uses textbooks published by the NCERT. Unit Tests and Term Exams are also conducted.

Umang

Sanskriti School also runs a parallel school called Umang, where underprivileged children are provided free education. Children living in Sanjay Basti, a slum behind the school, are the main students who attended Umang. These children are also provided with free food and water.

Sanskriti Model United Nations (SMUN) 
Sanskriti School annuals hosts the Sanskriti Model United Nations conference witnessing a footfall of 100-500 delegates from across India and its neighbouring countries like Nepal and Sri Lanka. It was first organised in 2012 and since then eight editions of the conference have taken place.

The event is organised and led by students of Class XI and Class XII - The Secretariat - along with the teachers. The Secretariat is further divided into multiple subcommittees, each in-charge of the conference panels, photography, press, logistics, and so on. The Secretariat hosts both the INTRA-SCHOOL SMUN as well as the INTER-SCHOOL SMUN.

Ranking 
According to the Hindustan Times, Sanskriti School was ranked the best school in Central Delhi in 2009 and second best in 2010. In 2015, it was ranked as the 6th best school in Delhi and the second best in Central Delhi. This school has also got ranked at top 6th position in Delhi at top10pick.in website.

See also
Gowri Ishwaran
Chanakya Puri
Indian Civil Service
Education in Delhi

References

External links
Official site

Schools in Delhi
Educational institutions established in 1998
1998 establishments in Delhi
Co-educational schools in India